Alexey Lvovich Naumov (born May 11, 1978, in Kolomna, Moscow Oblast) is a Russian professional motorcycle enduro and rally racer.

References

External links

 Official site

1978 births
People from Kolomna
Russian motorcycle racers
Off-road motorcycle racers
Dakar Rally drivers
Living people
Sportspeople from Moscow Oblast